is the first of a series of compilation albums of various Disney songs which has been remixed in the style of eurobeat. It is produced by Italian singer Dave Rodgers for Walt Disney Records and released exclusively in Japan. The first Eurobeat Disney was released on July 26, 2000. Some of the songs on this album are featured in the game Dance Dance Revolution Disney Mix and were part of the special event "Club Disney Super Dancin' Mania" at Tokyo Disneyland in 2000.

Track listing
 Domino - "Mickey Mouse March" (Eurobeat Version) (The Mickey Mouse Club) - 4:21
 Domino - "Macho Duck" (from the album Mickey Mouse Disco) - 4:42
 ABeatC All Stars - "It's A Small World" (Disneyland's It's A Small World) 4:16
 Derreck Simons - "Under The Sea" (The Little Mermaid) - 5:01
 King & Queen - "Winnie The Pooh" (The Many Adventures of Winnie the Pooh) - 4:27
 Domino - "Beauty and the Beast" (Beauty and the Beast) - 4:22
 Go Go Girls - "Supercalifragilisticexpialidocious" (Mary Poppins) 4:08
 Matt Land - "Heigh-Ho" (Snow White and the Seven Dwarfs) - 4:15
 Dave Rodgers - "You'll Be In My Heart" (Tarzan) - 4:24
 Domino - "Bibbidi-Bobbidi-Boo" (Cinderella) - 4:00
 Brian Ice - "He Lives in You" (The Lion King 2) - 4:41
 Domino - "Chim Chim Cher-ee" (Mary Poppins) - 4:34
 Mega NRG Man - "You've Got a Friend in Me" (Toy Story) - 4:24
 Domino - "Zip-a-Dee-Doo-Dah" (Song of the South) 4:29
 Dave & Domino - "Can You Feel the Love Tonight" (The Lion King) - 4:12
 Lolita - "When You Wish Upon a Star" (Pinocchio) - 4:10
 Domino - Mickey Mouse March (Summertime Extended Version) - 3:37

External links
Eurobeat Disney on Discogs

1
2000 compilation albums